Nicolaes de Giselaer, also Nicolaes de Geijselers, Nicolaes de Geyselers, Nicolaas de Gijselaer, Nicolaas de Gijzelaer, Nicolaes de Gyselaer, Nicolaas de Gyzelaer, Nicolaes de Ghyselaer (1583–c.1654) was a Dutch painter and draughtsman.

De Giselaer was born in Dordrecht.  Not much is known about his life, except through his works. From records it is known he was born in Dordrecht, and worked in Leiden and Utrecht in 1616, and later Amsterdam between 1616-1617. He eventually moved back to Utrecht, where he continued working until his death around 1654. The Centraal Museum has some of his works.  He died in Utrecht.

References

1583 births
1654 deaths
Dutch Golden Age painters
Dutch male painters
Dutch engravers
Artists from Dordrecht